Seven Keys to Baldpate is a 1935 film directed by William Hamilton and Edward Killy and starring Gene Raymond and Eric Blore. It is one of several filmed versions based on the popular 1913 play.

Cast
 Gene Raymond as Magee
 Margaret Callahan as Mary Norton, alias of Mary Johnson
 Eric Blore as Professor Bolton, alias of Harrison
 Grant Mitchell as Thomas Hayden
 Moroni Olsen as Jim Cargan
 Erin O'Brien-Moore as Mrs. Hayden, alias of Myra
 Henry Travers as Adlebert Peters
 Walter Brennan as Station agent
 Ray Mayer as Bland
 Erville Alderson as Chief of police
 Murray Alper as Max
 Harry Beresford as Lige Quimby
 Emma Dunn as Mrs. Quimby

Reception
The critic from The Washington Post said he could think of no two actors less alike than Gene Raymond and Richard Dix (who starred in the 1929 film version), apart from George Arliss and Harpo Marx, and said the film was a "sturdy old warhorse"; while
Variety wrote, "Too much conversation and too little action makes this mystery comedy, old stage success, only fairly amusing."

References

External links
 
 Seven Keys to Baldpate at TCMDB
 
 

1935 films
1935 romantic comedy films
American films based on plays
Films based on American novels
Films based on adaptations
American romantic comedy films
American black-and-white films
Films directed by Edward Killy
Films directed by William Hamilton (film editor)
Films based on Seven Keys to Baldpate
Films based on works by George M. Cohan
1930s American films